The 1993 season was the Minnesota Vikings' 33rd in the National Football League (NFL). The Vikings failed to match their 11–5 record from the previous season, finishing at 9–7. They finished in second place in the NFC Central to qualify for the playoffs, but lost 17–10 to the New York Giants in the wildcard round.

Newly acquired Jim McMahon, who was known for helping the Chicago Bears win Super Bowl XX in the 1985 season, was the Vikings starting quarterback for the season. He spent only one year with the team and after the season, the rebuilding Vikings decided not to renew McMahon's contract and he would go on to sign with other teams. The Vikings later acquired Warren Moon for next season.

Cris Carter and John Randle were named to play in the Pro Bowl after the season. It was the first Pro Bowl for both future Hall of Famers.

Terry Allen, who had a breakout season the previous year, missed the entire season after tearing his ACL in practice.

Offseason

1993 Draft

 The Vikings traded DT Keith Millard to the Seattle Seahawks in exchange for Seattle's third-round selection (57th overall) and 1992 second-round selection (39th overall).
 The Vikings traded their sixth-round selection (160th overall) to the Seattle Seahawks in exchange for DE George Hinkle and WR Joe Johnson.
 The Vikings traded their eighth-round selection (219th overall) to the San Francisco 49ers in exchange for RB Keith Henderson.

Preseason

Regular season

Schedule

Game summaries

Week 4: vs Green Bay Packers

Standings

Postseason

Statistics

Team leaders

League rankings

Staff

Roster

References

Minnesota Vikings seasons
Minnesota
Minnesota